Michael "Hutchy" Hutchinson is a Belizean politician. He is a former Minister of State for Labour, Local Government and Rural Development.

A member of the United Democratic Party, Hutchinson was elected to the Belize House of Representatives from the Belize Rural Central constituency in 2008, defeating People's United Party Cabinet minister Ralph Fonseca. He was defeated for re-election in 2012 by Dolores Balderamos-García.

References

Year of birth missing (living people)
Living people
United Democratic Party (Belize) politicians
Government ministers of Belize
Members of the Belize House of Representatives for Belize Rural Central